Carl Wagner (1901–1977) was a German physical chemist.

Carl Wagner is also the name of:

 Carl Wagner (painter) (1796–1867), German painter
 Carl-Ludwig Wagner (1930–2012), German CDU politician

See also
Karl Wagner (disambiguation)
Wagner (surname)